The Northeastern Huskies women's basketball team represents Northeastern University, located in Boston, Massachusetts, in NCAA Division I basketball competition. They compete in the Colonial Athletic Association.

History
Northeastern began play in 1966. They formerly played in the America East Conference (formerly known as the Seaboard Conference) until 2005. They participated in seven of the first 15 America East Conference women's basketball tournament finals, winning four of them, though only the last one resulted in an NCAA bid. In their only NCAA appearance, they lost to North Carolina 64-55.

Roster

Women's Basketball Coaching Staff
As of January 1, 2023:

NCAA tournament results

References

External links
 

 
1966 establishments in Massachusetts